The Texas Southern Lady Tigers basketball team is the women's basketball team that represents Texas Southern University in Houston, Texas, United States. The school's team currently competes in the Southwestern Athletic Conference. The Lady Tigers are led by head coach Vernette Skeete, entering her first year.

History

Coaches

Postseason results

NCAA Division I
Texas Southern has appeared in the NCAA Division I women's basketball tournament once. The Lady Tigers have a record of 0–1.

WNIT
The Tigers have appeared in the Women's National Invitation Tournament (WNIT) three times. Their record is 0–3.

NAIA
The Tigers made two appearances in the NAIA women's basketball tournament. Their record was 2–2.

References

External links
 

Texas Southern Tigers women's basketball